Abtar Rural District is a rural district (dehestan) in the Central District of Iranshahr County, Sistan and Baluchestan province, Iran. At the 2006 census, its population was 11,635, in 2,346 families. The rural district has 49 villages. At the 2016 census, its population was 10,624.

References 

Iranshahr County
Rural Districts of Sistan and Baluchestan Province
Populated places in Iranshahr County